The Blaise reaction is an organic reaction that forms a β-ketoester from the reaction of zinc metal with a α-bromoester and a nitrile. The reaction was first reported by Edmond Blaise (1872–1939) in 1901. The final intermediate is a metaloimine, which is then hydrolyzed to give the desired β-ketoester.

Bulky aliphatic esters tend to give higher yields. Steven Hannick and Yoshito Kishi have developed an improved procedure.

It has been noted that free hydroxyl groups can be tolerated in the course of this reaction, which is surprising for reactions of organometallic halides.

Mechanism
The mechanism of the Blaise reaction involves the formation of an organozinc complex with the bromine alpha to the ester carbonyl.  This makes the alpha carbon nucleophilic, allowing it to attack the electrophilic carbon of the nitrile.  The negative nitrile nitrogen resulting from this attack complexes with the zinc monobromide cation.  The β-enamino ester (tautomer of the imine intermediate pictured above) product is revealed by work-up with 50% K2CO3 aq.  If the β-ketoester is the desired product, addition of 1 M hydrochloric acid hydrolyzes the β-enamino ester to turn the enamino into a ketone, forming the β-ketoester.

See also
Blaise ketone synthesis
Reformatsky reaction

References
  Edmond E. Blaise; Compt. Rend. 1901, 132, 478.
  Rinehart, K. L., Jr. Organic Syntheses, Coll. Vol. 4, p. 120 (1963); Vol. 35, p. 15 (1955). (Article)
  Rao, H. S. P.; Rafi, S.; Padmavathy, K. Tetrahedron 2008, 64, 8037-8043. (Review)
  Cason, J.; Rinehart, K. L., Jr.; Thorston, S. D., Jr. J. Org. Chem. 1953, 18, 1594.
  Hannick, S. M.; Kishi, Y. J. Org. Chem. 1983, 48, 3833.
  Marko, I.E. J. Am. Chem. Soc. 2007, ASAP 
  Wang, D.; Yue, J.-M. Synlett 2005, 2077-2079.

External links 
 Blaise Reaction - Details and Recent Literature

Addition reactions
Carbon-carbon bond forming reactions
Name reactions